The 1995 Fort Worth Mayfest storm was a supercell storm that occurred on the 5–6 May in the Fort Worth and Tarrant County areas of Texas. At the time the storm was the costliest hailstorm in the United States history, causing  more than $2 billion in damage. The hail injured at least 100 people, and flash flooding and lightning from the same storm killed at least 13 people.

Causes
The cause of one of the most destructive hailstorms in recent history was a high precipitation supercell which developed suddenly ahead of and near the crescent of a fast-moving bow echo. The supercell died as quickly as it formed when it was engulfed by the advancing bow echo. The upper air sounding from Fort Worth that evening showed a perfect environment for high precipitation storms with sharp directional shear in the lowest layers, somewhat weak mid-level winds, and strong upper-level winds of 60-70 mph.

Warning
Very little warning of the storm was given, especially to those most vulnerable in the open at the Mayfest and this led to the injuries, damage and fatalities associated with this system.

Impact and damage
This led to 90 injuries requiring hospital treatment, including broken bones, lacerations and deep bruises, with many more minor injuries. Many people sheltered in cars after being caught outside in the hail, but the windshields shattered, causing numerous cuts from the broken glass. The large hail damaged cars, roofs, and houses. Over 80 reports of significant damage were reported, with tiled buildings bearing the brunt of the damage. The Colonial Savings, F.A., buildings were almost destroyed. Many cars were destroyed, and several houses severely damaged. The western part of Fort Worth, in the Ridglea and Ridgmar areas where many of the houses and commercial structures feature slate tile roofs, experienced catastrophic damage to roofs and underlying structures. The storm also cut power to 55,000 homes in the Tarrant area of Fort Worth.

Wind damage was also a feature of this powerful storm. The 60-70 mph (100–120 km/h) winds damaged roofs, blew many trees down and caused a few buildings to collapse.

Once the supercell was overtaken by the squall line, it slowed considerably, and the torrential rains caused flash flooding and at least 13 fatalities. Most of the drownings occurred while attempting to cross flooded roads. Some children died while playing around drainage culverts, and two people died when a roof overloaded with rainwater collapsed. The combination of the heavy rain and hail created a dense mixture of hail and water, blocking drains and making travel difficult, as well as creating a dense fog, adding to the severity of the floods and hampering rescue efforts.

9-1-1 lines were jammed during the storm due to so many people being caught unaware of the danger. Overall the storm caused damage in the range of 1 billion dollars, and with insurance premiums increasing, the true cost may have been even greater.

Legacy
The storm caught many meteorologists and the people out at Mayfest off guard. The sheer impact of the supercell prompted a huge response from everyone, volunteers and professionals alike.

Beginning a year after the storms and continuing ever since, volunteers from RACES - the Radio Amateur Civil Emergency Service - set up and operate a mobile weather command center at Mayfest. The mobile center is equipped with antennas, radios and computers connected to the NWS Fort Worth office's emergency management team and city police in the park.

With this new technology, the event can be cleared of people in 30 minutes if severe weather occurs.

See also 
 List of costly or deadly hailstorms

References

1995
1995-05
Mayfest Storm, 1995
Mayfest Storm, 1995
Mayfest